The Jägerbomb  is a bomb mixed drink made by dropping a shot of Jägermeister into an energy drink, typically Red Bull. Sometimes, this drink is incorrectly identified as a traditional "shot".

A Jägerbomb is typically served with a can of Red Bull or a similar style energy drink, poured into a pint glass and accompanied by Jägermeister in a shot glass. The glass of Jägermeister is dropped into the Red Bull by the bartender or the customer.

See also

 Caffeinated alcohol drinks ban
 Irish car bomb
 Sake bomb
 Skittle Bomb
 Rev-Bomb

References

Caffeinated alcoholic drinks
Cocktails
Cocktails with beer
Shooters (drinks)
Cocktails with liqueur

de:J%C3%A4germeister#Cocktails